Arthur Acland may refer to:

 Sir Arthur Acland (died 1610) (1573–1610) of Acland, Landkey, Devon, knight
 Arthur Floyer-Acland (1885–1980), British soldier
Sir Arthur Dyke Acland, 13th Baronet (1847–1926), Liberal politician and political author
Geoffrey Acland (Arthur Geoffrey Dyke Acland, 1908–1964), Liberal politician
Arthur Acland (MP), British Member of Parliament for Barnstaple